F51 most often refers to:
 North American F-51 Mustang, an American fighter aircraft

F51 may also refer to:
 Farman F.51, a French maritime reconnaissance flying boat
 , a Tribal-class destroyer of the Royal Navy
 , a Blackwood-class frigate of the Royal Navy
 , an armed merchant cruiser of the Royal Navy
 , a Talwar-class frigate of the Indian Navy
 Nonorganic sleep disorder